Norwayne can refer to:

Norwayne Historic District, a residential historic district in Westland, Michigan
Norwayne Middle School, a school in Wayne County, North Carolina
Norwayne High School, a school in Creston, Ohio